In enzymology, a polynucleotide adenylyltransferase is an enzyme that catalyzes the chemical reaction
ATP + RNA-3'OH  pyrophosphate + RNApA-3'OH

Thus, the two substrates of this enzyme are ATP and RNA, whereas its two products are pyrophosphate and RNA with an extra adenosine nucleotide at its 3' end.

Human genes with this activity include TUT1, MTPAP, PAPOLA, PAPOLB, PAPOLG, TENT2, TENT4A, TENT4B, TENT5C, TENT5D.

Naming

This enzyme belongs to the family of transferases, specifically those transferring phosphorus-containing nucleotide groups (nucleotidyltransferases).  The systematic name of this enzyme class is ATP:polynucleotide adenylyltransferase.

Other names in common use include:
 NTP polymerase
 RNA adenylating enzyme
 AMP polynucleotidylexotransferase
 ATP-polynucleotide adenylyltransferase
 ATP:polynucleotidylexotransferase
 Poly(A) polymerase
 Poly(A) synthetase
 Polyadenylate nucleotidyltransferase
 Polyadenylate polymerase
 Polyadenylate synthetase
 Polyadenylic acid polymerase
 Polyadenylic polymerase
 Terminal riboadenylate transferase
 Poly(A) hydrolase
 RNA formation factors
 PF1
 Adenosine triphosphate:ribonucleic acid adenylyltransferase

Function

This enzyme is responsible for the addition of the 3' polyadenine tail to a newly synthesized pre-messenger RNA (pre-mRNA) molecule during the process of gene transcription. The protein is the final addition to a large protein complex that also contains smaller assemblies known as the cleavage and polyadenylation specificity factor (CPSF) and cleavage stimulatory factor (CtSF) and its binding is a necessary prerequisite to the cleavage of the 3' end of the pre-mRNA. After cleavage of the 3' signaling region that directs the assembly of the complex, polyadenylate polymerase (PAP) adds the polyadenine tail to the new 3' end.

The rate at which PAP adds adenine nucleotides is dependent on the presence of another regulatory protein, PABPII (poly-adenine binding protein II). The first few nucleotides added by PAP are added very slowly, but the short polyadenine tail is then bound by PABPII, which accelerates the rate of adenine addition by PAP. The final tail is about 200-250 adenine nucleotides long in mammals.

PAP is phosphorylated by mitosis-promoting factor, a key regulator of the cell cycle. High phosphorylation levels decrease PAP activity.

Structural studies

References

 
 
 
 
 
 
 

EC 2.7.7
Enzymes of known structure